Boulevard Puerto Aéreo metro station is a station of the Mexico City Metro in Venustiano Carranza, Mexico City. It is an underground station with two side platforms served by Line 1 (the Pink Line) between Balbuena and Gómez Farías stations. It serves the colonias (neighborhoods) of Moctezuma, Santa Cruz Aviación, and Valentín Gómez Farías. It lies below Puerto Aéreo Boulevard, from which it receives its name, and it is near Calzada Ignacio Zaragoza. The station's pictogram features a silhouette of an air vent below a road bridge, in reference to a landmark found at the intersection of both avenues. The station is partially accessible for people with disabilities.

Boulevard Puerto Aéreo station opened on 4 September 1969 as Aeropuerto metro station with service westward toward Chapultepec and eastward toward Zaragoza. Because the station was the closest to the Mexico City International Airport at the time of its opening, the station's former pictogram featured the silhouette of an airliner. By 1981, this function was replaced by Terminal Aérea station on Line 5 (the Yellow Line). However, due to the constant confusion of travelers, the authorities changed the name and logo of the station in 1997. 

In 2019, the station had an average daily ridership of 23,095 passengers, making it the 63rd busiest station in the network and the 13th busiest of the line. Since 11 July 2022, the station has remained closed due to modernization works on the tunnel and the line's technical equipment.

Location

Boulevard Puerto Aéreo is a metro station located along the avenue of the same name and Calzada Ignacio Zaragoza, in Venustiano Carranza, Mexico City. The station serves the colonias (Mexican Spanish for "neighborhoods") of Moctezuma, Santa Cruz Aviación, and Valentín Gómez Farías. Within the system, the station lies between Balbuena and Gómez Farías. The area is serviced by a Centro de transferencia modal (CETRAM), a type of transport hub, Line 4 (formerly Line G) of the trolleybus system, by Route 43 of the Red de Transporte de Pasajeros network, and by Route 20-B of the city's public bus system.

Exits
There are six exits.
 North: Puerto Aéreo Boulevard, Santa Cruz Aviación.
 Northeast: Puerto Aéreo Boulevard, Santa Cruz Aviación.
 Northwest: Puerto Aéreo Boulevard, Moctezuma.
 South: Puerto Aéreo Boulevard, Valentín Gómez Farías.
 Southeast: Calzada Ignacio Zaragoza, Valentín Gómez Farías.
 Southwest: Puerto Aéreo Boulevard, Valentín Gómez Farías.

History and construction

Line 1 of the Mexico City Metro was built by Ingeniería de Sistemas de Transportes Metropolitano, Electrometro and Cometro, the latter a subsidiary of Empresas ICA. Its first section opened on 4 September 1969, operating from Chapultepec to Zaragoza stations. The station is partially accessible for people with disabilities. In 2016, the station received renovation works; these included repairs to ticket offices, floors, walls, ceilings, electrical installations, lighting, paging system and video surveillance system.

Originally the station was named Aeropuerto as it was the closest to the Mexico City International Airport, although it is located around 15 blocks away from it. Its original pictogram featured an airliner to symbolize it. By 1981, Terminal Aérea station on Line 5 (the Yellow Line) was built next to the airport, however, people still got off at Aeropuerto due to the confusing name and pictogram. It was until 1997 that the station was renamed "Boulevard Puerto Aéreo" and the logo was replaced with a pictogram of a bridge with a dome below in reference to a nearby air vent found below a bridge and whose purpose is to prevent the street garbage from entering the platforms.

The station will be closed during 2022 for modernization work on the tunnel and technical equipment of the line.

Incidents
On 2 June 2021, the station received a bomb threat. After six hours of examinations, the Secretariat of Security discarded the existence of explosives.

Ridership
According to the data provided by the authorities since the 2000s, commuters have averaged per year between 14,900 and 43,600 daily entrances in the last decade. In 2019, before the impact of the COVID-19 pandemic on public transport, the station's ridership totaled 8,429,972 passengers, which was an increase of 78,230 passengers compared to 2018. In the same year, Boulevard Puerto Aéreo metro station was the 63rd busiest station of the system's 195 stations, and it was the line's 13th busiest.

Notes

References

External links

 

1969 establishments in Mexico
Accessible Mexico City Metro stations
Mexico City Metro Line 1 stations
Mexico City Metro stations in Venustiano Carranza, Mexico City
Railway stations located underground in Mexico
Railway stations opened in 1969